WSTI-FM (105.3 FM) better known as "Star 105.3" is a radio station broadcasting an Urban Contemporary format. Licensed to Quitman, Georgia, United States, the station is currently owned by Black Crow Media and features programming from ABC Radio, Jones Radio Network and Westwood One. Notable programming includes syndicated Steve Harvey Morning Show and syndicated Ride with Doug and DeDe.

History
The station went on the air as WGAF-FM on 1986-10-01.  On 1987-08-01, the station changed its call sign to the current WSTI.

References

External links

STI-FM
Urban contemporary radio stations in the United States